Rolla Leonard Anderson (August 1, 1920 – April 25, 2018) was an American football and basketball coach. He served as the head football at Kalamazoo College in Kalamazoo, Michigan for 14 seasons, from 1953 to 1966, compiling a record of 56–56–1. Anderson was also the head basketball coach at Kalamazoo for two seasons, from 1953 to 1955, tallying a mark of 12–25.

Life and career
A native of Mount Vernon, Illinois, Anderson played football and basketball at Southeast Missouri State Teachers College, now Southeast Missouri State University, and at Western Michigan College, now Western Michigan University, graduating from the latter in 1944. Anderson married Patricia Jean Anderson (November 18, 1922 – March 15, 2010) on December 23, 1944 in Washington, D.C. He died in April 2018 at the age of 97.

Head coaching record

Football

References

External links
 

1920 births
2018 deaths
American football ends
American men's basketball players
Kalamazoo Hornets football coaches
Kalamazoo Hornets men's basketball coaches
Southeast Missouri State Redhawks football players
Southeast Missouri State Redhawks men's basketball players
Western Michigan Broncos football players
Western Michigan Broncos men's basketball players
People from Mount Vernon, Illinois
Coaches of American football from Illinois
Players of American football from Illinois
Basketball players from Illinois